Caapucú (Guaraní: Ka'apuku) Municipio De Caapucú en  Departamento De Paraguarí de  Paraguay, En el censo de 2002 tenia una poblacion de 7,249, esta localizada a 141 km de Asunción, La capital de Paraguay

La Ruta N° 01. atravesa la ciudad.

Fue fundada en 1787 por Pedro de Melo de Portugal, Previamente se la conocía como Capilla Tuvá.

Caapucú is the biggest district of the department, located in the south region of the latter; it is separated from the Misiones Department by the Tebicuary River.

In the city are many housings from colonial times, most of them built in the time around the Paraguayan  Independence. One of them, the Stevant house, resembling a  castle, has been turned into a museum that exhibits artifacts from that time.

Economy

The area that borders the Tebicuary River is a land that is victim of flooding, and is a good area for fishing.

Caapucú is an area mostly dedicated to cattle rising of cows, sheep, pigs and horses.

The agriculture activity is orientated mostly to the production for interne consumption of the population; they cultivate sweet cane, grapes, cotton and manioc. Among the main economical activities of the district are the shoe industry, the shops and workshop of craftsmanship, like wood carvings, confection of wardrove in “aó po’I”, “encaje jú” and crafts on leather.

Municipality

Caapucú was founded by Pedro de Melo de Portugal, on August 15, 1787, more to the north of its current location.

The city moved around 1816, during the government of José Gaspar Rodríguez de Francia, due to the shortage of water in the original location.

The current Mayor of the District is Lourdes Sanabria Brítez Ugarte, member of the Liberal Party, and she'll be in office for the period of 2006-2010.

The city has seven health care facilities, four sport clubs, four clean-up councils and municipal slaughterhouse.

Tourism

Caapucú's touristic spots include the Municipal Square “Punta Arenas” located in the banks of the Tebicuary River, the touristic state “Santa Clara”, located 8 kilometers away from the city and several streams, as well as the area's squares and historical museums.

From Caapucú it's possible to go to other recreational places like Laguna Verá, also called Ypoa-Guazú, where people can go fishing and boating. The place also has a resort near the stream Paso Ybycuí, with installations for camping and sports.

A tour for the hills Charorá, Virgen, Yaguarete-cuá, Tarumá, Mariño, Villalba, Arayhú and Mbocayá allow the visitors to view the natural landscape and lakes.

The main attraction of Caapucú are its beaches of white sand by the Tebicuary River, located in the city of Villa Florida.

The foundation of the city is remembered in the month of August with a party, parades and sport competitions. The folkloric festival “Che Rendá Alazán” is organized every year in the month of February, and the National Festivity of the “Arriero” in October.

References

External links
Secretaria Nacional de Turismo
World Gazeteer: Paraguay – World-Gazetteer.com

Caapucú District